Wildfire Wildfire Records is an American independent record label based in Baltimore, Maryland.

History 
The Wildfire Wildfire project was founded in 2005 by Devon Deimler, Matthew Papich, and Michael Petruzzo while students at the Maryland Institute College of Art in Baltimore, MD. While there, Deimler and Papich became friends with many musicians of different influences and were inspired to collaborate and curate shows according to their own aesthetic.  A website was created and managed to announce independent local shows of their liking and often featured drawings of local bands as a visual element.

In 2006, Wildfire Wildfire became a record label as well, intending their first release to be a Baltimore mixtape by Cex.

In addition to releasing records, Wildfire Wildfire has also hosted dozens of DIY music shows, many notably at the warehouse space Floristree in downtown Baltimore.  In 2007, they collaborated with Dan Deacon to curate and host the Whartscape Festival, and in 2008 collaborated with Floristree to present Full House Festival, which included a performance by the Krautrock band Cluster.

Matthew Papich is also a founding member of Ecstatic Sunshine and is currently the band's only permanent member.

Manifesto 
On their website, Wildfire Wildfire lists their influences as 60s zine culture and its art world crossover, along with an early DIY punk rock ethos. Notes Deimler, such a combination allows the label "to release music and artwork important to our generation of experimentation".

Poster design and multimedia elements beyond music are often incorporated into Wildfire-curated shows, blurring the line between the art and music world. Wildfire Wildfire illustration, media, and poster design have become a staple in the burgeoning Baltimore experimental music scene

Catalog 
WFWF001 - Santa Dads Anima Mundi CD
WFWF002 - Thank You World City CD
WFWF003 - Dan Deacon Spiderman of the Rings LP
WFWF004 - Video Hippos Unbeast the Leash LP
WFWF005 - OCDJ Hooray CD
WFWF006 - Ecstatic Sunshine Living EP + CD
WFWF007 - Cex Dannibal LP
WFWF008 - Sandcats / Car Clutch Friendship/Trip01 Split 7"
WFWF009 - Lucky Dragons / Ecstatic Sunshine Friendship/Trip02 Split 7"
WFWF010 - Dustin Wong Seasons LP (June 2009)
WFWF011 - Jason Willett / Jason Urick Friendship/Trip03 Split 7"

External links
 Wildfire Wildfire - official site

Notes

American independent record labels
Record labels based in Maryland